The United States Virgin Islands general election  was held on November 8, 2016. Voters chose the delegate to the United States House of Representatives and all fifteen seats in the Legislature of the Virgin Islands.'''

U.S. House of Representatives

Incumbent Delegate Stacey Plaskett, a Democrat, sought re-election to her congressional seat. Her Republican opponent, Gordon Ackley, was kept off the ballot after election officials canceled the primary election.

Running without an opponent on the ballot, she won re-election with 97.51% of vote.

Legislature of the Virgin Islands

All fifteen seats in the Legislature of the Virgin Islands were contested. Controversy erupted after allegations surfaced that a candidate for the St. Thomas-St. John District, Kevin Rodriquez lied about his residency. Rodriquez was barred from taking a seat in the Legislature of the Virgin Islands after a ruling from the Supreme Court of the Virgin Islands. A special election was called by the Governor of the United States Virgin Islands, Kenneth Mapp to be held on April 8, 2017.

References

2016
2016 elections in the Caribbean
2016 United States Virgin Islands elections